Food Unwrapped is a 2014 book about the food industry by the British writer Daniel Tapper. It is based on a BBC Channel 4 television series of the same name, and covers food science and food technology in mass-produced foods with the objective of "dispel[ing] food myths and reveal[ing] some truths about the food we buy". Subjects covered in the book include the relative merits of sea salt versus table salt; and the harm or lack of harm in artificial food colorings and flavorings.

The book's author has also been a contributor to The Guardian and Waitrose Kitchen. In 2013, using knowledge he acquired as a self-taught homebrewer, Tapper opened a brewery producing American pale ale style beer (using American Cascade hops).

References

External links
http://www.lawagency.co.uk/writer/daniel-tapper

2014 non-fiction books
Books about food and drink
British books
Transworld Publishers books
Works about the food industry